Aethria melanobasis is a moth of the subfamily Arctiinae. It was described by Herbert Druce in 1897. It is found in Brazil.

References

Moths described in 1897
Arctiinae
Moths of South America